Danilo Lopes Cezario (born 25 April 1991), commonly known as Danilo, is a Brazilian footballer who plays as a forward for Thai League 3 club Pattaya Dolphins United.

Career
A graduate of the youth setup of Santos Futebol Clube, Danilo started his senior professional career with Clube Atlético Penapolense in 2012. In the following years, he represented Clube Recreativo e Atlético Catalano and Associação Atlética Anapolina. While playing for the latter, he managed to score six goals in the Campeonato Goiano competition. On 29 April 2014, he signed with top tier club Goiás Esporte Clube. On 14 May, he scored his first goal for the club in a 2–0 victory over Botafogo.

On 27 August 2015, Danilo was loaned to second tier club Paraná till the end of December 2015. On 9 November 2017, he switched to the Indian Super League and signed for NorthEast United FC as a replacement of fellow Brazilian Wellington who expressed his inability to play for the club due to personal reasons. He scored his first goal for the club in a 2–0 victory over Delhi Dynamos FC on 2 December.

References

External links 

1991 births
Living people
Brazilian footballers
Brazilian expatriate footballers
Association football midfielders
Campeonato Brasileiro Série A players
Campeonato Brasileiro Série B players
Campeonato Brasileiro Série C players
Campeonato Brasileiro Série D players
Indian Super League players
Clube Atlético Penapolense players
Clube Recreativo e Atlético Catalano players
Associação Atlética Anapolina players
Vila Nova Futebol Clube players
Paraná Clube players
Rio Claro Futebol Clube players
Anápolis Futebol Clube players
Goiás Esporte Clube players
Hapoel Tel Aviv F.C. players
NorthEast United FC players
Thai League 1 players
Thai League 2 players
Kasetsart F.C. players
Rayong F.C. players
Chiangmai F.C. players
Esporte Clube Água Santa players
Clube Atlético Juventus players
Sportspeople from Minas Gerais
Brazilian expatriate sportspeople in Israel
Brazilian expatriate sportspeople in India
Brazilian expatriate sportspeople in Thailand
Expatriate footballers in Israel
Expatriate footballers in India
Expatriate footballers in Thailand